Lei Yue Mun Park and Holiday Village is a holiday village located in the east of Shau Kei Wan, facing Lei Yue Mun, with an area of 22.97 hectares. It used to be  Lyemun Barracks, barracks for the British soldiers stationed in Hong Kong prior to its conversion into a holiday village, the only holiday camp owned by the government in the urban districts of Hong Kong (Hong Kong Island and Kowloon).

History

Early Construction 
Lyemun Barracks was named after the fishing village of Lei Yue Mun. The old Lyemun Barracks was one of the earliest and most important British Army fortifications in Hong Kong. Situated at the northeast corner of Hong Kong Island overlooking the eastern approach to the Victoria Harbour, Lei Yue Mun occupied a strategic position. In 1885, the military decided to build a permanent infrastructure at Lei Yue Mun and later in 1889, the land was transferred to the War Department for the construction. The Barracks consisted mainly of three portions:

The central area: Main Barracks (Lei Yue Mun Park and Holiday Village)

The western ridge: Upper Fort (Sai Wan Fort)

The headland: (Lei Yue Mun Fort, now the Hong Kong Museum of Coastal Defence, Pak Sha Wan Battery)

Significance in World War II (1941-1945) 
The fortifications of Lei Yue Mun had already become an important point of coastal defense during the 1890s and continued to expand in the following decades. By the 1930s, however, the strategic importance of Lei Yue Mun had declined considerably as a result of technological and tactical advances.

On 19 December 1941, the Barracks along with the Sai Wan Antiaircraft Battery fell into the hands of the Japanese. At 7:45 PM, a detachment of Japanese soldiers along with collaborators, in a lorry, broke through the fence, using bombs and killed the British sentries at the Sai Wan Antiaircraft Battery. The rest of the soldiers, around 29 British soldiers, were locked in an ammunition magazine, until around midnight, the Japanese ordered the soldiers to get out, and bayonetted all of the soldiers, two Chinese-British soldiers survived by hiding under the corpses, escaping successfully after four days of lying still amongst the corpses.

There were counterattacks made by 'C' Company of the Royal Rifles of Canada to recapture the battery and the barracks during the 19th of December, but the counterattacks failed, due to the Japanese having the advantage of high ground and being well-entrenched.

Conversion to the Holiday Village 
The Barracks housed the Depot and Record Office of the Hong Kong Military Service Corps between 1948 and 1986. The Barracks were handed over to the Government in 1987 and were subsequently converted into the Lei Yue Mun Park and Holiday Village.

After the Lyemun Barracks were left disabled and were handed over to the Government, the Southern Part was converted into the Lei Yue Mun Park and Holiday Village, while the headland was left unused and lost until it was converted into the Hong Kong Museum of Coastal Defence in 2000 (Does not include the Pak Sha Wan Battery and nearby structures).

The whole former barracks compound is graded as Grade I historic building because of its historic significance. The buildings of the compound are graded as Grade I and II historic buildings separately, however.

SARS Outbreak 
During the outbreak of the Severe acute respiratory syndrome (SARS) in 2003, a larger cluster of cases in Hong Kong were focused on the Amoy Gardens housing estate, particularly in Block E. Its spread was later suspected to have been facilitated by defects in its drainage system, and it was subsequently discovered that fecal-oral transmission of SARS was possible. By March, the total number of infected people have reached over 200, 137 of those residing in Block E. By the end of the month, the government issued an order to transfer the remaining unaffected residents of Block E into isolation in the Lei Yue Mun Park and Holiday Village and the Lady MacLehose Holiday Village in Sai Kung. The residents were subsequently returned to their homes after Hong Kong was removed from the World Health Organization (WHO)'s list of 'Affected Areas' in late-June 2003.

Coronavirus 
In January 2020, SARS-CoV-2 emerged in Wuhan, China, and began spreading across the globe. By January 22, 2 confirmed cases of COVID-19 emerged in the SAR and the government set up two quarantine locations, the Lei Yue Mun Park and Holiday Village and the Lady MacLehose Holiday Village. 5 citizens who came in close contact with the 2 victims of the coronavirus were put into isolation at one of the two quarantine camps.

Buildings and facilities

Facilities 
The holiday village include a total of 4 family hostels and 2 group hostels, all provided with balconies, bedrooms, and lavatories with showering facilities, accommodating the living of up to 282 people. It has transformed into a park/holiday village, with facilities such as rope courses, a horse-riding school (with a very steep hiking/hacking route up the nearby hillsides), tennis courts, basketball courts, football pitches, as well as other facilities for numerous indoor and outdoor entertainment. The barracks once housed by soldiers have now been transformed into small living quarters for the holiday village. Each block has a different purpose, providing different facilities for campers to enjoy, the most well-known being Block 10, the main Recreational Center, and Block 7, the Coffee Corner.

Buildings 

As the Lei Yue Mun Park and Holiday Village was constructed in the early 20th century, the buildings inside the Holiday Camp were modelled on the European-style buildings at the time of their construction. Most buildings share a similar color scheme, with white as their primary color and light blue as their secondary color, usually found on window frames. The buildings were located across hillsides, with passageways linking them. The buildings of the previously known Lyemun Barracks were converted into Lei Yue Mun Park and Holiday Village, with a number of exceptions. One example of this would be Block 8, an outhouse located behind the Coffee Corner, with the area listed as out of bounds and prohibited to enter, although tourists could follow a pathway behind Block 10 to reach it.
Block 3, located diagonally from the Canteen (Block 4), was previously left unused and deactivated. Its surrounding area was sealed off, though tourists could risk climbing a nearby stone slope, and over the iron wire mesh to enter it. In May 2016, the Food and Environmental Hygiene Department proposed converting the then deactivated Block 3 into a quarantine facility, with the function to prevent epidemics from spreading in case of an outbreak. The conversion would be scheduled to undergo in late-2017 to 2019. However, even with the building re-painted, it is still unclear whether the proposed plan went through as the facility was never opened to the public. As a result, its current status remains a mystery.

Ever since its days as the Lyemun Barracks, buildings within the Holiday Village have had a number assigned to them for easier identification. Additionally, these buildings have had their respective numbers painted on their exterior, usually in places easily noticeable to assist people to distinguish one from another. Certain historic buildings have had their year of completion inscribed convexly, with Blocks 2, 3, 10 (Extension in 1935), 30, 31, 32, 33 and 34 earning that privilege. Although most buildings within the Holiday Village have retained these numbers, due to maintenance of exteriors and re-painting, some buildings have had their numbers removed in the process, or replaced with printed numbers using relatively modern fonts.

Renovation 

In between January and July 2018, Block 7, the 'Coffee Corner', underwent renovation procedures to improve the building's interior. After the refurbishment, the Coffee Corner was reopened in August 2018 and presented itself as more aesthetically appealing. Major changes included the floor, replacing plastic texture sheets with polished wood tiles, with parts of walls and pillars fitted with dark marble coatings, and general lighting improvements. This renovation also introduced drawings hung on walls, depicting the layout of the previously known Royal Artillery Barracks. This includes the Soldiers' Barracks (Block 10), Officers' Barracks (Block 7), Outhouses (Block 8, Block 11, Block 12, Block 13), Married Quarters (Block 14, Demolished) and the Guard House (Block 15, Demolished). These drawings illustrate each building's exterior and interior structure in their days as part of the Lyemun Barracks.

Based on these illustrations, it can be deduced that during the process of conversion into the Holiday Village, the structures had to be altered to be catered to the building's new purposes. For example, the Officers' Quarters' original structure consisted of individual rooms, a big contrast to the current design of the Coffee Corner, being one large living room with several smaller rooms on the sides. Another drawing depicts the locations of these buildings on a hand-drawn map, suggesting that Block 10 was originally built to be shorter in length, but was extended subsequent to the demolition of the Married Quarters, which occupied said space. Furthermore, Block 9 was not present in the illustrations, which could suggest that either Block 9 was not built at the time of the residential period of the Royal Artillery Army, or that Block 9 was present but was not part of the Artillery barracks to be included in the drawings.

Pak Sha Wan Battery 
There's a road right next to the Lei Yue Mun Public Riding School, with a locked gate preventing tourists from entering. According to the map, the road continues to stretch towards the coast, and crosses the Island Eastern Corridor as a bridge. Along the road are buildings previously part of the Lyemun Barracks, alongside the Pak Sha Wan Battery, which were left isolated and lost from the Holiday Village, now claimed as property of the Hong Kong Museum of Coastal Defense. However, these places were not open to the public, and tourists would get inside themselves through various methods, either finding themselves on the bridge over the Island Eastern Corridor, or just inside the area. Maintenance along this area is shown to be poor, as leaves and fallen tree branches are often found, with a car parking gate left closed at the end of the bridge, the road then continues to the deactivated and isolated blocks of the former Lyemun Barracks.

Block 1, the 'Changing Room' 

Situated on a small hillside beside the Eastern Corridor, the green and white structure uses a different color scheme than other buildings, and was formerly used as a Changing Room for soldiers before pool training. Block 1's structure remains intact, though in poor condition, with glass pieces and layers of dried up paint scattered across the rooms, with broken doors and showering facilities gone rusty. Several signs pasted on the walls and pillars have also deteriorated and not legible, with both the main swimming pool, and two other hot tubs blocked off with concrete.

Block 44, the 'Sniper Room' 
Other structures within the isolated area share the same poor condition, with Block 44 being another example. Named the 'Sniper Room', the block resembles a sniper ranch with a round window near the roof of the front wall. The white structure remains intact with significant evidence of deterioration, with chipped paint on walls peeled off and broken floor tiles. The impaired condition shared by these isolated and deactivated buildings is a drastic comparison to the buildings converted into parts of the holiday village, in addition to its proof of the barracks' lengthy history.

Structures and historic buildings
The whole compound was graded as a Grade I historic structure, while some buildings were graded as Grade I and Grade II individually, these ratings were confirmed on 18 December 2009.

Three of the buildings in the Holiday Village were declared historical monument on 20 May 2016 and are now protected under the Antiquities and Monuments Ordinance. This includes Block 7, Block 10 and Block 25.

The following are all structures of the former Lyemun Barracks, some of them graded as Historic Buildings.

Number Location Note: [Original] implies that the number was painted on by soldiers since their construction, [Replica] implies that it was re-printed on using a different font, represented by [Font].

References

External links

Official website

Eastern District, Hong Kong
Military of Hong Kong under British rule
Barracks in Hong Kong
Grade I historic buildings in Hong Kong